Airdrie-Rocky View was a provincial electoral district in Alberta, Canada, mandated to return a single member to the Legislative Assembly of Alberta using the first past the post method of voting from 1997 to 2004.

History

The riding was created in the 1997 electoral district re-distribution to encompass the area North and East of the City of Calgary. The former Three Hills-Airdrie electoral district was split, with the north part of the riding merged with Olds-Didsbury, to form Olds-Didsbury-Three Hills, the south half forming the eastern portion of Airdrie-Rocky View. The southern portion of Olds-Didsbury and western portion of Drumheller would also be transferred to Airdrie-Rocky View.

The Airdrie-Rocky View electoral district was abolished in the 2003 electoral boundary re-distribution and the territory being formed into the new electoral districts of Airdrie-Chestermere to the East, and Foothills-Rocky View to the West.

Election results

1997 general election

2001 general election

See also
List of Alberta provincial electoral districts

References

Further reading

External links
Elections Alberta
The Legislative Assembly of Alberta
election-atlas.ca - 1997 Airdrie-Rocky View

Former provincial electoral districts of Alberta
Airdrie, Alberta